Elbert Sevier Martin (ca. 1829 – September 3, 1876) was a nineteenth-century Congressman and newspaper publisher from Virginia. He was the brother of John Preston Martin.

Biography
Born near Jonesville, Virginia, Martin attended the public schools as a child and went on to attend Emory and Henry College from 1845 to 1848. He engaged in mercantile pursuits in Jonesville before being elected an Independent Democrat to the United States House of Representatives in 1858, serving from 1859 to 1861, being unsuccessful for reelection in 1860. Martin served in the Confederate Army during the Civil War as captain of a company of volunteers which was formed in his hometown of Jonesville. After the war, Martin moved to Dallas, Texas in 1870 and became interested in the newspaper publishing business. He died in Dallas on September 3, 1876.

References
 Retrieved on 2008-10-10

1826 births
1876 deaths
Members of the United States House of Representatives from Virginia
Emory and Henry College alumni
Confederate States Army officers
19th-century American newspaper publishers (people)
Date of birth missing
People from Jonesville, Virginia
Virginia Democrats
People of Virginia in the American Civil War
Virginia Independents
Independent Democrat members of the United States House of Representatives
19th-century American journalists
American male journalists
19th-century male writers
19th-century American politicians
Journalists from Virginia